Nur Fazura Binti Sharifuddin (born 27 September 1983), better known as Fazura, is a Malaysian actress, singer, television Host, VJ began her career in the Malaysian entertainment industry by hosting a television show and several minor acting roles. She was the host of a television show called Teens World. In 2004, she launched her film career by playing the leading role in Bicara Hati which became her break-out role and earned her an award nomination. Later in 2005, she starred in the film Gol & Gincu.

Up to 2010, she has done more than 10 featured films and countless hit TV series and dramas as well as hosting a number of television program.

Early life and education
Fazura was born in one of the rural province at Pekan, a town in the state of Pahang in Malaysia. She is the third of four siblings, and has three brothers. Her father died on 14 September 2000. She enrolled at a Fashion Design College and studied fashion for a while before quitting after a few months saying, "because my interest in the course dwindled after a while". and accepted an offer to star in Qaisy & Laila. She was discovered and been given the big break by film producer-director, Datin Rosnani Jamil.

Career

2002–06: Early career, breakthrough and Gol and Gincu

In the Gol & Gincu film, Fazura played Putri, a bubbly-energetic girl who was suddenly being dumped by her boyfriend Eddy (Ashraf Sinclair) for Sasha (Sazzy Falak) that then decides to try and win over Eddy's heart by starting her own futsal team. 2005 also marked the first time Fazura landed the main role on a television series, Inspirion. Co-starring opposite Eizlan Yusof, the series directed by Rashid Sibir was broadcast on TV3. In 2006, Gol & Gincu went from a huge successful film onto a commercial TV series, Gol & Gincu The Series which premiered on 4 June 2006 in which Fazura reprised her role as Putri. The TV series marking Fazura second appearances in television series.

2007–2008: films and TV drama
Fazura started 2007 with more works. Fazura went to playing the lead role in the 2007 film Kayangan and was cast in two TV drama series, Datin Diaries and Kasih Suci. Fazura co-starred alongside two Indonesian actors in both Kayangan and Kasih Suci. Kayangan was released on 9 August 2007, but was considered a box-office failure. In the same year, Fazura went back to her route as a TV host to become a VJ on MTV Asia network channel. She hosted shows called MTV Jus and MTV Pop Inc. throughout the year. Fazura also reprised her role as Putri for the second season of the hit Gol & Gincu The Series which aired starting on 8 July 2007. In 2008, Fazura co-starred in the film titled Selamat Pagi Cinta playing Julia together with Pierre Andre, Sharifah Amani and Que Haidar. Later that year, Fazura was cast in another TV series playing the title character in Ezora. Premiered on 19 May, on TV3, the TV series was one of the hit drama series during the period. It premiered only for one season. Also in 2008, Fazura guest-starred on horror TV series called Keliwon.

2009–2011: Pisau Cukur, ESPN, Lagenda Budak Setan and TV movie and drama
In 2009, Fazura starred in Pisau Cukur, Fazura played a character named Intan who went to a vacation on a luxury cruise ship to cheer up her best friend Bella, played by Maya Karin, whereas while on the ship they encounter three Datuks, their wives and two children, one private detective and one die-hard-fan of Bella's. The film released on 5 November 2009 and became a box-office hit. It was the first time Fazura and Maya Karin have made a film together. In the same year, Fazura was chosen to host a reality program show alongside Rusdi Ramli called Anak Wayang as well as Malaysia's sport entertainment programme on ESPN Star Sports channel called MyEG Xtra Time! alongside Marion Caunter. In 2010, Fazura signed on as Katerina/Kate, one of the central character in the novel adaptation film, Lagenda Budak Setan and received good reviews from critics and fans alike for her performance in the film.

Fazura acted in an Islamic theme drama series and its television movie, Kitab Cinta as well as Tahajjud Cinta for Al-Hijrah and TV3 respectively.

2012–2013: House of Doll and return to TV
In 2012, Fazura ventured into fashion business by opening a boutique called 'House Of Doll', located in Bangsar, Kuala Lumpur. Her only film that year was Bujang Terlajak alongside comedians, Saiful Apek, Johan and Nabil.

The following year, Fazura return to the small screen in a 13 episodes drama on TV3, "Kisah Cinta" alongside Shaheizy Sam.

2014: Return to silver screen, music and reality TV show
Fazura returned to the silver screen in early 2014 with the release of new horror-comedy, "Kami Histeria", followed by a psychological-drama thriller, "Tembus" in the middle of 2014 and "Manisnya Cinta Di Cappadocia" in December. Fazura won the Best Actress Award at the 27th Malaysia Film Festival Awards for "Manisnya Cinta Di Cappadocia".

She also ventured into the music scene with the release of her first single, "Sayangi Dirimu" and was chosen to star in E!'s first Malaysian miniseries title, "Facing Up to Fazura". The series premiered across Asia starting 14 December 2014 on E! News Asia.

2015–present
She took one step ahead by announcing three variants of body mists spray — "I Love You", "Spotlight" and "Berry Beautiful" through her own brand namely "Mystical by Fazura" under her own company label, Doll Domination, which was launched on 14 October 2015 at her boutique, whilst saying she wanted to focus more on building her brand.

At the same time, she emerged with a new single called "Bangun", created by Lea Ismail (The Wak Lu's), one of the band members who was also involved in the mini showcase that was being held at Hard Rock Cafe Melaka, in the same month. At the time, Fazura had announced that she was planning to produce a mini album which would consist of about 7 songs.

On 18 October 2015, Fazura appeared live in a mini showcase at Hard Rock Cafe, Melaka alongside her band, "The Wak Lu's", and performed eight songs.
She also collaborated with a local alternative rock band, Estranged in a ballad called "Hancur Aku". Their official music video currently marks more than 12 million views on YouTube.

Fazura intends to concentrate on her career.

Fazura's most recent film, Langit Cinta was released on 7 January 2016.
She also plays Janet in the Indonesian film Bulan Terbelah Di Langit Amerika. She told reporters in an interview that she will be involved with two film projects in Indonesia apart from a joint discussion with Astro Shaw for her new film, but she could not provide any further details.

Filmography

Film

Telemovie

Television series

Theatre performances

Television

Music video

Discography

Studio album
 2017: Fazura

Singles

Personal life
On 23 November 2017, it was confirmed that she and actor, Fattah Amin got engaged on 13 November 2017. The pair made the official announcement at a packed press conference. They both met while shooting for the drama Hero Seorang Cinderella which aired on Slot MegaDrama Astro Ria. They got married in a private ceremony where only family members and close friends were invited on 27 November 2017, at Ritz Carlton hotel in Kuala Lumpur.

Awards and nominations

References

External links

 
 

1983 births
Living people
Malaysian people of Malay descent
Malaysian Muslims
Malaysian actresses
Malaysian television actresses
People from Pahang
Malaysian film actresses
21st-century Malaysian actresses